This is a list of Sites of Special Scientific Interest (SSSIs) in Nottinghamshire, a county in the East Midlands. The data in this table is taken from English Nature's website in the form of citation sheets for each SSSI.

As of March 2012 there are 66 SSSIs in Nottinghamshire. 63 are notable for their biological interest, 1 for its geology and 2 for both geological and biological interest.

For other counties, see List of SSSIs by Area of Search.

Sites

See also 

 List of SSSIs by Area of Search

Notes 
  Data rounded to one decimal place.
  Grid reference is based on the British national grid reference system, also known as OSGB36, and is the system used by the Ordnance Survey.
  Those SSSIs with more than one OS grid reference are composed of multiple sections, separated by non-SSSI land.
  Link to maps using the Nature  on the Map service provided by Natural England.

References

External links 

 
Nottinghamshire
Sites of Special